Club 6 is a Canadian music television series which aired on CBC Television between October 1960 and 1962.

CHUM deejays Mike Darrow and Bob Willson played popular music for teens to dance to with featured performances by Tommy Ambrose, Pat Hervey, the Walter Boys and the Mickey Shannon Combo. The show was produced from a selected high school in Toronto.

External links 
 Club 6 at the Canadian Communications Foundation
 

1960 Canadian television series debuts
1962 Canadian television series endings
1960s Canadian music television series
Television shows filmed in Toronto